Metropolitan Transit Authority may refer to:

 Metropolitan Transit Authority (Boston), succeeded by the Massachusetts Bay Transportation Authority (MBTA)
 Metropolitan Transit Authority (Victoria), Melbourne, Australia
 Erie Metropolitan Transit Authority, Pennsylvania
 Metropolitan Transit Authority of Harris County, Texas
 Metropolitan Transit Authority (Miami-Dade), Florida
 Nashville Metropolitan Transit Authority, Tennessee
 Topeka Metropolitan Transit Authority, Kansas

See also
 Metropolitan Transportation Authority, New York
 Los Angeles County Metropolitan Transportation Authority, California
San Diego Metropolitan Transit System
 Réseau de transport métropolitain, Montreal, Canada
 MTA (disambiguation), for other things abbreviated "MTA"